Alja Varagić (born 11 December 1990 as Alja Koren) is a Slovenian handball player for RK Krim and the Slovenian national team.

International honours
EHF Cup Winners' Cup:
Semifinalist: 2016

References

1990 births
Living people
Sportspeople from Celje
Slovenian female handball players
Expatriate handball players
Slovenian expatriate sportspeople in Hungary
Mediterranean Games competitors for Slovenia
Competitors at the 2009 Mediterranean Games